Pilyevo is a rural locality (a village) in Beketovskoye Rural Settlement, Vozhegodsky District, Vologda Oblast, Russia. The population was 14 as of 2002.

Geography 
Pilyevo is located 58 km west of Vozhega (the district's administrative centre) by road. Bykovo is the nearest rural locality.

References 

Rural localities in Vozhegodsky District